Jeeya Jurir Xubax (lit. "Fragrance of an alive brook") is a 2014 Assamese language drama film written and directed by Sanjib Sabhapandit. It was produced by Utpal Kumar Das and features ensemble cast, including Victor Banerjee and Bishnu Kharghoria.  The film was released at mobile cinema on 13 March 2014.

Plot 
In a remote riverside a plaque was accidentally discovered from a burial. It reveals that something had happened to this person at the hands of the British. The people assumed he was a freedom fighter, hence a martyr and proper recognition should be given to him. The government declared to erect a statue in honour of the great martyr as an attempt to gain political advantage. But there was no reference, not even a photograph which can form the basis of the statue. The children of the martyr's family try to figure out their ancestor's face by looking through the hereditary characteristics that are passed onto genetically. They examine the faces of different generations to discover similarity and commonality to create the 'probable' person. But gradually they realized that a real man is found not in his appearance but in his works, so they try to discover and evaluate his deeds.

Meanwhile, the older people are busy in digging out orthodox caste matters, the youths are busy more in the celebration aspects and the government is busy in trying to score political issues. At last, the children thought that they have found the real man and give shape to their understanding in the form of a play, through which people get a look into the past of a person, of the village, of the times.

Cast 

 Victor Banerjee as Dhon
 Bishnu Kharghoria as Kon
 Pranami Bora
 Kalpana Kalita
 Dibyajyoti Das
 Indra Bania
 Pranjal Saikia
 Anup Hazarika
 Angoorlata

 Atul Pachoni
 Himangshu Das
 Ashimkrishna Barua
 Rajiv Kro
 Biren Hazarika
 Jyoti Narayan Nath
 Sagarika
 Aaswash Mahanta
 Arunav

Release 
Jeeya Jurir Xubax was premiered and released on 13 March 2014 at DiGi Films, a mobile cinema theater by NK Productions. At that time the venue of screening was the playground of Gopal Boro Higher Secondary School in Ganeshguri, Guwahati.

Production 
Sanjib Sabhapandit, who earlier won Best Film Award on Environment Conservation/Preservation in 51st National Film Awards for Juye Poora Xoon, has directed the film. In an interview with The Hindu, he reveals the idea behind the film. Assam’s contribution to the Indian freedom movement is usually ignored, deliberately sidelined, which influenced him to make this film.

References 

Indian drama films
Films set in Assam
2010s Assamese-language films
2014 drama films